Taninganway Min (c. 1689 – 14 November 1733) was king of the Toungoo dynasty of Burma (Myanmar) from 1714 to 1733. The long and slow descent of the dynasty finally came to the forefront during his reign in the form of internal and external instabilities. He faced a rebellion by his uncle Governor of Pagan at his accession. In the northwest, the Manipuri horsemen raided Burmese territory in early 1724. The retaliatory expedition to Manipur in November 1724 failed. In the east, southern Lan Na (Chiang Mai), under Burmese rule since 1558, successfully revolted in 1727. Taninganway tried to recapture the breakaway region twice but both tries failed. By 1732, southern Lan Na was independent although a strong Burmese garrison in Chiang Saen in northern Lan Na confined the rebellion to the Ping valley around Chiang Mai.

In 1724, U Kala completed Maha Yazawin (the Great Chronicle), the first comprehensive national chronicle of Burmese history based on earlier sources.

Early life
He was born to the heir apparent Prince Sanay and his chief queen Maha Dewi in 1689. He was made heir apparent on 1 November 1711 (Sunday, 8th waning of Tazaungmon 1073 ME).

Notes

References

Bibliography
 
 
 

Rulers of Toungoo
1733 deaths
1689 births
18th-century Burmese monarchs